The 2015–16 Copa Catalunya was the 17th season of Copa Catalunya.  

The Final Four was played at the Pavelló Municipal in Sant Adrià de Besós. UB Sant Adrià won the title. 

Copa Federació was played at Podium Joan Masgrau in Viladecans. UB Sant Adrià won the title.

Format

Regular season
32 teams are divided in two groups by geographical criteria.

Final stage
The Final Stage will be played in play-off ties in a two-legged format, with the exception of the final four.

Relegation PlayOffs
In the relegation playoffs, teams played against each other must win two games to win the series. The winners remain at Copa Catalunya for the next season.

Teams

Venues and locations

Regular season

Group 1

1 CB Viladecans resigned to its place in Liga EBA.
2 CB Valls achieved a vacant berth in Liga EBA.
3 AB El Vendrell exchanges a place on CC 2ª Categoria with AD Torreforta.

Group 2

1 UE Mataró achieved a vacant berth in Liga EBA
2 CB Cerdanyola achieved a vacant berth in Liga EBA

Relegation PlayOffs
The first legs were played on 15 May 2016, the second legs on 22 May 2016 and the third legs, if necessary, on 29 May 2016.

|}

Final round

Quarter-finals
The first legs was played on 14–15 May, and the second legs was played on 21–22 May 2016.

|}

Final four
Games played at the Pavelló Municipal in Sant Adrià de Besós

Bracket

Semifinals

Third place game

Championship game

Awards

MVP

 Pol Bassas (UB Sant Adrià)

Copa Federació
The Copa Federació was played on 2–3 January 2016, by the four best teams after the end of the year (round 13) in both groups. Games was played at Podium Joan Masgrau in Viladecans.

Bracket

Semifinals

Championship game

References and notes

Copa Catalunya
Copa Catalunya
Copa Catalunya